Stanislav Aleksandrovich Khoteyev (born 7 March 1981) is a former Russian professional footballer.

Club career
He made his professional debut in the Russian Second Division in 1998 for the reserve team of FC Lokomotiv Moscow.

He played for the main team of FC Anzhi Makhachkala in a Russian Cup game.

External links

References

1981 births
Footballers from Moscow
Living people
Russian footballers
Association football goalkeepers
FC Lokomotiv Moscow players
FC Anzhi Makhachkala players
FC Fakel Voronezh players
FC Izhevsk players
FC Volga Nizhny Novgorod players
FC Rostov players
FC Shinnik Yaroslavl players
Russian Premier League players